Fred Raynham was a British actor of the silent era.

Selected filmography
 Edge O' Beyond (1919)
 The Hound of the Baskervilles (1921)
 Expiation (1922)
 Little Brother of God (1922)
 The Passionate Friends (1922)
 The Wandering Jew (1923)
 The Indian Love Lyrics (1923)
 The Great Prince Shan (1924)
 The Presumption of Stanley Hay, MP (1925)
 A Romance of Mayfair (1925)
 A Daughter of Love (1925)
 Confessions (1925)
 Somebody's Darling (1925)
 The Flag Lieutenant (1926)
 Further Adventures of a Flag Officer (1927)
 Boadicea (1928)
 Spangles (1928)
 The Burgomaster of Stilemonde (1929)

References

External links

Year of birth unknown
Year of death unknown
British male silent film actors
20th-century British male actors